The 1996 Connecticut Huskies football team represented the University of Connecticut in the 1996 NCAA Division I-AA football season.  The Huskies were led by third year head coach Skip Holtz, and completed the season with a record of 4–6.

Schedule

References

Connecticut
UConn Huskies football seasons
Connecticut Huskies football